Elizabeth Moore Aubin is an American diplomat and State Department official who has served as the United States ambassador to Algeria since 2022. She served the acting principal deputy assistant secretary and deputy assistant secretary for Regional Multilateral Affairs from January 20, 2021 to June 7, 2021.

Early life and education 

Aubin is a native of Great Falls, Virginia. She attended Langley High School, graduating in 1983. Aubin earned her Bachelor of Arts from Barnard College of Columbia University in 1987 and did graduate work at the Maxwell School of Citizenship and Public Affairs of Syracuse University.

Career 

Aubin, a career member of the Senior Foreign Service, class of Minister-Counselor, is the Acting Principal Deputy Assistant Secretary in the Bureau of Near Eastern Affairs at the Department of State. Other senior leadership roles held by Aubin during her three decades of service are Executive Director of the Joint Executive Office of the Bureau of Near Eastern Affairs and the Bureau of South and Central Asian Affairs, Deputy Chief of Mission of the U.S. Embassy in Ottawa, Canada in 2017; from 2014 to 2016 she was the executive director of the Bureau of Western Hemisphere Affairs; and Deputy Chief of Mission of the U.S. Embassy in Algiers, Algeria. Additional roles in her career include when she also served as the management counselor for embassy in Tel Aviv; international resource management officer for USNATO in Brussels; management officer at the Consulate General in Toronto; and as a general services officer at the Consulate General in Hong Kong. Her two entry-level tours were at the embassy in Rome and at the Consulate General in Curaçao.

United States ambassador to Algeria 

On April 15, 2021, President Joe Biden nominated Aubin to be the next United States Ambassador to Algeria. Hearings on her nomination were held before the Senate Foreign Relations Committee on June 9, 2021. The committee reported her favorably to the Senate floor on June 24, 2021. On December 18, 2021, the United States Senate confirmed her by voice vote. 

Aubin presented her credentials to President Abdelmadjid Tebboune on February 9, 2022.

Personal life
Aubin speaks French and Italian. She is the niece of computer scientist Edward F. Moore.

See also
Ambassadors of the United States

References

Living people
Year of birth missing (living people)
Place of birth missing (living people)
21st-century American diplomats
21st-century American women
Ambassadors of the United States to Algeria
American women ambassadors
Barnard College alumni
People from Great Falls, Virginia
United States Department of State officials
United States Foreign Service personnel
American women diplomats